Donald Johnson and Piet Norval were the defending champions but only Johnson competed that year with Nenad Zimonjić.

Johnson and Zimonjić lost in the final 6–4, 6–1 against Radek Štěpánek and Michal Tabara.

Seeds

  Donald Johnson /  Nenad Zimonjić (final)
  Dominik Hrbatý /  David Rikl (semifinals)
  Joshua Eagle /  Andrew Florent (semifinals)
  Lucas Arnold /  Tomás Carbonell (first round)

Draw

External links
 2001 Estoril Open Men's Doubles draw

2001 Men's Doubles
Doubles
Estoril Open